A candle warmer is an electric warmer that melts a candle or scented wax to release its scent. The candle warmer shown is intended to be used with jar candles or candles in cups, not with taper candles or candles without containers large enough to accommodate all the melted wax. Some candle warmers have a built-in bowl in which the candle is placed.

The advantages of using a candle warmer include the absence of open flame and the soot that often results from burning wax. The main disadvantage of a plate candle warmer is candle life.  While the candle can still be burned (provided the wick is still exposed), the wax no longer contains any fragrances. Many warmers are designed to be used with "wickless" candles, which are blocks or lumps of scented candle wax with no wick. It is also used to keep hot beverages such as coffee warm by placing the mug on the warmer.

General benefits 
Candle warmers are a safer option for burning candles and/or wax because there is no open flame and many candle warmers come with an auto-off function, which reduces the risk of house-fire. In addition to these safety benefits, candle warmers do not produce any soot and burn candles more efficiently. With large candles in particular, often the wax furthest from the wick does not melt. A candle warmer solves this problem by heating the candle evenly.

General disadvantages
The key disadvantage to using a candle warmer is that the wax loses it fragrance more quickly than when being burned by flame. In addition to this, candle warmers cost more than a box of matches or even a lighter, with prices ranging from $8.00 to nearly $50.00 for a single warmer. And of course, multiple candle warmers are needed to burn multiple candles at the same time. Similarly, access to electrical outlets is also needed for each warmer, which limits the spaces one can use a candle warmer. Additionally, not all candles can be used with candle warmers. Only candles in glass jars that appropriately fit the size of the warmer plate may be used. This excludes tapered candles, candles without containers, and small or very large candles.

Safety warnings
Vegetable-based wax candles are likely to explode if used in a candle warmer.
Such explosions may occur because the wax at the bottom of the candle expands as it melts, building up pressure and eventually forcing through either the solid wax layer above it or the glass container.  A candle heated by its own flame melts from the top down and therefore cannot explode in this manner.

Though a candle warmer does not employ the use of an open flame to burn a candle, the plate the candle sits on is still a hot surface. Therefore, users should be aware to keep candle warmers away from flammable surfaces, children, pets, and be mindful not to touch the plate while in use. In addition to this, users should be aware of the voltage requirements/ limitations of the device and the voltage of the electrical outlets in their home to prevent damage and harm to oneself and home.

References

Candles
Heating